The 1947 BAA playoffs was the postseason tournament that followed the inaugural Basketball Association of America 1946–47 season. After its 1948–49 season, the BAA merged with the older National Basketball League to create the National Basketball Association or NBA. The tournament concluded with the Philadelphia Warriors defeating the Chicago Stags, 4 games to 1, in the BAA Finals.

The six qualified teams all began tournament play on Wednesday, April 2, and the Finals concluded on Tuesday, April 22. Philadelphia and Chicago played 10 and 11 games in the span of 21 days but their final series was compact, five games in seven days.

Playoffs
There were no byes. Western and Eastern champions Chicago and Washington immediately played a long semifinal series with Washington having home-court advantage. Chicago won the sixth game in Washington one day before Philadelphia concluded its two short series with other runners-up. In the 1947 BAA Finals, the Philadelphia Warriors defeated the Chicago Stags 4-1.

First round

(E2) Philadelphia Warriors vs. (W2) St. Louis Bombers 

This was the first playoff meeting between these two teams.

(E3) New York Knicks vs. (W3) Cleveland Rebels 

This was the first playoff meeting between these two teams.

BAA Semifinals

(E1) Washington Capitols vs. (W1) Chicago Stags 

This was the first playoff meeting between these two teams.

(E2) Philadelphia Warriors vs. (E3) New York Knicks 

This was the first playoff meeting between these two teams.

BAA Finals: (E2) Philadelphia Warriors vs. (W1) Chicago Stags

This was the first playoff meeting between these two teams.

References

External links
 1947 Playoff Results at NBA.com 
 1947 BAA Playoffs at Basketball-Reference.com

Playoffs
Basketball Association of America playoffs

fi:BAA-kausi 1946–1947#Pudotuspelit